The Central Greene School District is a small, rural public school district located in Greene County, Pennsylvania. The district serves: the Borough of Waynesburg and Franklin Township, Perry Township, Washington Township, Wayne Township and Whiteley Township. In 1962, the district was created through an agreed joining of school administrations in each six townships served. The district is located about sixty miles south of Pittsburgh and twenty miles north of Morgantown, West Virginia. According to the 2000 federal census data, Central Greene School District served a resident population of 16,681. By 2010, the district's population declined to 15,902 people. In 2009 the district residents' per capita income was $14,354, while the median family income was $39,358. The educational attainment levels for the population 25 and over were 84.8% high school graduates and 15.8% college graduates.

Central Greene School District operates three schools: Waynesburg Central Elementary School, Margaret Bell Miller Middle School and Waynesburg Central High School. The facilities include a pool, a football stadium, an auditorium, a soccer field and indoor basketball courts that are used as a community center for the Waynesburg area. High school students may choose to attend Greene County Career and Technology Center for training in the construction and mechanical trades. The Intermediate Unit IU1 provides the district with a wide variety of services like specialized education for disabled students and hearing, speech and visual disability services and professional development for staff and faculty.

Extracurriculars
Central Greene School District offers a variety of clubs, activities and interscholastic sports.

Sports
The district funds:

Boys
Baseball – AAA
Basketball- AAA
Cross Country – AA
Football – AA
Golf – AA
Rifle
Soccer – AA
Track and Field – AA
Wrestling	– AA

Girls
Basketball – AAA
Cross Country – AA
Rifle
Soccer (Fall) – AA
Softball – AA
Track and Field – AA
Volleyball – AA

Middle School Sports

Boys
Basketball
Football
Soccer
Track and Field
Wrestling	

Girls
Basketball
Soccer
Softball 
Track and Field
Volleyball

According to PIAA directory July 2012

Closed school
On August 9, 2011, the Central Greene School Board voted to close Perry Elementary as a cost-saving measure. All elementary students in the district were shifted to attend Waynesburg Central Elementary School.

References

External links 
Central Greene School District

School districts established in 1962
School districts in Greene County, Pennsylvania
Education in Greene County, Pennsylvania
Greene County, Pennsylvania
1962 establishments in Pennsylvania